The Betsy Ross Mares Invitational Pace is a harness race for Standardbred mare pacers run annually since 2008 at Harrah's Philadelphia Racetrack.

Historical race events
In 2009, Southwind Tempo won her second straight Betsy Ross Pace. Her time of 1:48 3/5 set a World Record for female pacers over a 5/8 mile track.

Records
 Most wins by a horse
 2 – Southwind Tempo (2008, 2009) & Anndrovette (2011, 2014)

 Most wins by a driver
 4 – Tim Tetrick (2009, 2011, 2014, 2016)

 Most wins by a trainer
 2 – Ross Croghan (2008, 2009)

 Most wins by an Owner
 3 – Bamond Racing LLC (211, 2014, 2016)

 Stakes record
 1:48 3/5 – Southwind Tempo (2009) (NWR)

Winners of the Betsy Ross Mares Invitational Pace

References

Recurring sporting events established in 2008
Harness racing in the United States
Horse races in Pennsylvania
2008 establishments in Pennsylvania